Zhanar Dugalova (Janar Dūğalova; born 17 January 1987) is a Kazakh singer, who won the Turkvision Song Contest 2014 representing  with the song "Izin kórem". She is also a former member of Kazakhstani pop group KeshYou. Since August 2014 she has continued her career independently.

Biography
Dugalova was born in Kyzylorda, southern Kazakhstan, before moving with her family to Almaty. Years before her debut in the music industry, she took part in the contest Zhas Kanat, a national music festival which aimed to launch the careers of amateur and new singers. After her performance in the festival, well-known producer Bayan Esentayeva became interested in her voice. She was hailed for her powerful voice and her beauty. In late 2012, she released her first single "Súıemin deshi", which was used as a song in the soundtrack of the movie "Ǵashyq júrek" (A cocktail with stars) where she also had a role. The popularity of the film and the success of the song turned the young singer into a celebrity.

With KeshYou 
In 2013, she was included in the new lineup of KeshYou, a well-known band in Kazakhstan, which is also known for its almost constant lineup changes. Her first single with KeshYou was the song "Asıqpa", which was a smash hit in Kazakhstan, topping the airplay charts for months.

Zhanar became more popular than Aidana Medenova and Kamshat Joldibayeva, the other two vocals of KeshYou. Thanks to the enormous promotional effort by Bayan Esentayeva, the popularity of the band increased, producing many more hit singles including "Qazaq qyzdary" (Kazakh girls). The band also participated in 's national final for the Turkvision Song Contest 2013 with the song "Rizamyn", which placed fourth, and became another hit. During this part of her music career, Zhanar Dugalova combined her KeshYou trajectory with solo songs.

Solo 
Dugalova left KeshYou in 2014. She released more solo songs with the collaboration of her producer Bayan Esentayeva, increasing her popularity. Dugalova won the Kazakhstani national final for the Turkvision Song Contest 2014 with the song "Izin kórem", and went on to represent Kazakhstan in the contest in Kazan, Tatarstan, Russia. She qualified from the semi-final on 19 November 2014 and won the contest on 21 November 2014 with 225 points.

Having become a national heroine, Dugalova released more songs and took part in many national events. In 2015, the singer met then-President of Kazakhstan Nursultan Nazarbayev, who invited her to a convention of Kazakhstani women in which other successful Kazakhstani personalities such as female volleyball player Sabina Altynbekova took part.

In April 2017, Dugalova expressed interest in representing Kazakhstan in the Eurovision Song Contest. As of 2022, Kazakhstan has never participated in the contest.

Singles

With KeshYou
 Asyqpa  (2013)
 Qazaq qyzdary  (2013)
 Týǵan jer  (2013)
 Rızamyn  (2013)
 Mahabbat  (2014)

Solo
 Tańdanba  (2011)
 Súıemin deshi  (2012)
 Sen emes  (2012)
 Kim úshin  (2013)
 Bir sýraq  (2013)
 Ýaıymdama  (2013)
 Izin kórem  (2014)
 Sen meni túsinbedin , With Kairat Nurtas (2014)
 Aıta bersin , with Ninety One on Gakku Áýenderi 2016
 Ala ketpediń  (2017)

References

1987 births
21st-century Kazakhstani women singers
Kazakhstani pop singers
Kazakh folk singers
Living people
People from Kyzylorda
Turkvision Song Contest entrants
Turkvision Song Contest winners